

Sovereign states

A
 Aceh -  
 Adal -  
Airgíalla -  Capital: Not specified
 Alsace - 
 Anhalt - 
Annam
 Ansbach - 
 Aragon - 
Arakan - 
 Armagnac - 
Armorica - 
 Ashanti - 
Assam - 
 Astrakhan - 
 Austria - 
 Auvergne - 
 Ayutthaya - 
Aztec -

B
 Margraviate of Baden
Kingdom of Bali
 Duchy of Bavaria
 Béarn - Viscounty of Béarn
Kingdom of Bengal
 Empire of Benin
Berar Sultanate
Kingdom of Bhadgaon
Sultanate of Bijapur
 Duchy of Bourbonnais
 Margraviate of Brandenburg
 Archbishopric of Bremen
 Duchy of Brittany
 - Sultanate of Brunei
 Duchy of Brunswick-Lüneburg
Khanate of Bukhara

C
 Catalonia - Principality of Catalonia 
 Ceylon - Kotte Kingdom
Kingdom of Chabor (Chaibor, Kheibar)
Chagatai Khanate
Kingdom of Champa
Cherokee Tribe
China - Empire of the Great Ming
 Duchy of Cleves
 Electorate of Cologne
 Kingdom of Connacht
 Cospaia - Republic of Cospaia
Creek Tribe
 Crimea - Crimean Khanate

D
Kingdom of Đại Việt
Sultanate of Delhi
 Kingdom of Denmark
Sultanate of Dulkadir

E
 Kingdom of England
 Ethiopian Empire

F
 Kingdom of France
Kingdom of Funj

G
 Duchy of Gelre
 Most Serene Republic of Genoa
 Kingdom of Georgia
Kingdom of Golconda (Qutb Shahi dynasty)
Kingdom of Gondwana
Sultanate of Gujarat

H
Sheikdom of al-Haasa
 Free and Hanseatic City of Hamburg
Hausa Kingdoms
 Landgraviate of Hesse
Huron Tribe

I
Inca Empire
Iroquois Tribe

J
Japan - Sengoku period

K
Bornu Empire
  - Kingdom of Kartli
Sultanate of Kashmir
Kazakh Khanate
 Khanate of Kazan
Kingdom of Khandesh
 Khanate of Khiva
Khmer Empire
 Knights Hospitaller - 
 Kingdom of Kongo
 Korea - Kingdom of Joseon

L
Kingdom of Lan Na
Kingdom of Lan Xang
 Kingdom of Leinster
 Prince-Bishopric of Liège
  Grand Duchy of Lithuania
 Duchy of Lorraine

M
 Archbishopric of Mainz
Sultanate of Makassar
Malacca Sultanate
 Sultanate of Maldives
Mali Empire
Malwa Sultanate
 Mamluk Sultanate
Manchu - Manchu People
Kingdom of Manipur
 Duchy of Mantua
Maya Empire
 Duchy of Mecklenburg
 Duchy of Milan
 Duchy of Modena and Reggio
 Principality of Moldavia
 Principality of Monaco
Mongol Khanate
Montenegro
 Sultanate of Morocco
Kingdom of Mrauk U
 Mughal Empire
 Kingdom of Munster
 Prince-Bishopric of Münster
 Muscovy - Grand Duchy of Moscow
Kingdom of Mutapa
 Mysore - Kingdom of Mysore

N
 Nejd - 
Namayan
 Kingdom of Navarre
 Naxos - Duchy of the Archipelago
Kingdom of Nepal
Nogai Horde
 Kingdom of Norway

O
Oirat Horde
 County of Oldenburg
Kingdom of Odisha
 Duchy of Orléans
 Sublime Ottoman State
Oyo Empire

P
 Electorate of the Palatinate
 Papal States
Pattani Kingdom
Kingdom of Pegu
 Persian Empire
 Kingdom of Poland
 Duchy of Pomerania
 Kingdom of Portugal
 Duchy of Prussia

Q
Qasim Khanate

R
 Republic of Ragusa
 Archbishopric of Riga
 Ryukyu Kingdom

S
 Archbishopric of Salzburg
 Most Serene Republic of San Marino
 County of Santa Fiora
 Duchy of Savoy
 Electorate of Saxony
 Kingdom of Scotland
Kingdom of Shan
Shawnee Tribe
Khanate of Sibir
 Republic of Siena
 Duchy of Silesia
Songhai Empire
 - Habsburg Kingdom of Spain
 Kingdom of Sukhothai
 Sultanate of Sulu
Swahili Tribe
 Kingdom of Sweden
 Old Swiss Confederacy

T
Terra Mariana (Livonian Confederation)

U
Uí Failghe - Kingdom of Uí Failghe

W
Principality of Wallachia

States claiming sovereignty
Republic of Goust

Notes

Sov